Rafael Da Costa Capote (born 5 October 1987) is a Cuban-born Qatari handball player for Al-Duhail and the Qatari national team.

Gallery

References

External links

1987 births
Living people
Cuban male handball players
Sportspeople from Havana
Naturalised citizens of Qatar
Cuban emigrants to Qatar
Qatari male handball players
Handball players at the 2016 Summer Olympics
Olympic handball players of Qatar
Handball players at the 2014 Asian Games
Handball players at the 2018 Asian Games
Asian Games gold medalists for Qatar
Asian Games medalists in handball
Medalists at the 2014 Asian Games
Medalists at the 2018 Asian Games
Liga ASOBAL players